Leptocometes obscurus is a species of beetle in the family Cerambycidae. It was described by Monné in 1990.

References

Leptocometes
Beetles described in 1990